The 2014 NBA Development League Draft was the 14th draft of the National Basketball Association Development League (NBDL). The draft was held on November 1, 2014, just before the 2014–15 season.

Key

Draft

First round

Second round

Third round

Fourth round

Fifth round

Sixth Round

Seventh Round

Eighth Round

References
 D-League Draft Big Board

draft
NBA G League draft
NBA Development League draft